Cherokee Plantation may refer to:

Cherokee Plantation (Fort Payne, Alabama), Fort Payne, Alabama, listed on the National Register of Historic Places in De Kalb County, Alabama
Cherokee Plantation (Natchez, Louisiana), Cane River National Heritage Area, listed on the National Register of Historic Places in Natchitoches Parish, Louisiana